Salesville may refer to some places in the United States:

 Salesville, Arkansas
 Salesville, Ohio